The first USS Patapsco was a sloop in the United States Navy.

Patapsco was launched as Chesapeake 20 June 1799 by Captain De Rochbruns, and renamed Patapsco between 10 October and 14 November apparently to free the name for the frigate , commissioned in 1800. Patapsco is the name of a river in Maryland.

Commanded by Captain Henry Geddes, she escorted the brig Acteon to New Orleans, carrying General James Wilkinson and his staff to that port. She then cruised in the West Indies, protecting American shipping from French cruisers and privateers during the Quasi-War with France. Operating in Commodore Silas Talbot's squadron, she captured schooner Cecilia after a five-hour chase 28 May 1800. On 7 August she captured French letter of marque Dorade. In the autumn she also engaged Louisa Bridge but the schooner escaped.

She aided  and a British frigate in defeating a French invasion of Curaçao, in the Netherlands Antilles, before returning to Philadelphia in December. She was sold there in June 1801.

References
 

Sloops of the United States Navy
1799 ships